R2A agar (Reasoner's 2A agar) is a culture medium developed to study bacteria which normally inhabit potable water.  These bacteria tend to be slow-growing species and would quickly be suppressed by faster-growing species on a richer culture medium.

Since its development in 1985, it has been found to allow the culturing of many other bacteria that will not readily grow on fuller, complex organic media.

Typical composition (% w/v)

 Proteose peptone,   0.05%
 Casamino acids,      0.05%
 Yeast extract,      0.05%
 Dextrose,           0.05%
 Soluble starch,    0.05%
 Dipotassium phosphate,   0.03%
 Magnesium sulfate,  0.005%
 Sodium pyruvate,  0.03%
 Agar,  1.5%
Final pH 7.2 ± 0.2 @ 25 °C

References

Cell culture media